The British Interlingua Society (BIS; Interlingua: Societate Britannic pro Interlingua), established in 1956, works in Great Britain and the English-speaking world to promote the knowledge and active use of Interlingua, the international language. Among the publications of the BIS is the transatlantic magazine "Lingua e Vita", with articles in English and Interlingua. It has appeared since 1965, and previously as the "Littera Circular" or Circular Letter. A second BIS publication is "Contacto". Founded in 1994, this magazine provides articles and regular features about Interlingua and the organization. Contacto is written in English and in parallel Interlingua-English texts.

References

External links
 Portrait del organisationes de interlingua, Historia de Interlingua, 2001, Reviewed 2006.
 Gopsill, F. P., 100 editiones britannic, Historia de Interlingua, 2001, Reviewed 2006.

Interlingua organizations
1956 establishments in the United Kingdom
Organizations established in 1956
Educational organisations based in the United Kingdom